Motu Manawa-Pollen Island Marine Reserve is a  protected area in the Waitemata Harbour in Auckland, New Zealand, established in 1996. It includes the entire area between Rosebank Peninsula and Waterview, and surrounds Motumānawa / Pollen Island and Traherne Island. Its northeastern boundary runs roughly parallel to Rosebank Peninsula, from the mouth of the Oakley Creek estuary. Its northernmost boundary is north of Pollen Island, at the same latitude as the tip of Point Chevalier. Its westernmost point is in the mouth of the Whau River, between the tip of Rosebank Peninsula and Te Atatū. It is bisected by the Northwestern Motorway.

History 

The marine reserve was established in 1996.

Biodiversity 

The marine reserve includes intertidal mudflats, tidal channels, mangrove swamp, salt marsh and shellbanks. The intertidal ecosystem of the reserve is home to  number of plant species, including Selliera radicans, Juncus kraussii and Apodasmia similis. The mudlfats are feeding grounds for a number of migratory bird species, including red knots, bar-tailed godwits, pied oystercatchers and wrybills.

See also
Marine reserves of New Zealand

References

External links
Motu Manawa-Pollen Island Marine Reserve: Places to go in Auckland, fact sheet and map at the Department of Conservation
Motu Manawa Restoration at Forest and Bird

Marine reserves of New Zealand
Protected areas of the Auckland Region
Protected areas established in 1996
1996 establishments in New Zealand
Waitematā Harbour
Whau Local Board Area
West Auckland, New Zealand